Lepidotrigla is a genus of marine ray-finned fishes belonging to the family Triglidae, the gurnards and sea robins. These gurnards are found in the Eastern Atlantic, Indian and Western Pacific Oceans.

Taxonomy
Lepidotrigla was first described as a genus in 1860 by the German-born British herpetologist and ichthyologist Albert Günther with Trigla aspera, which had been described in 1829 from the Mediterranean Sea by Georges Cuvier, as the type species. The genus is classified within the subfamily Triglinae, the nominate subfamily of the family Triglidae. The genus name prefixes Trigla, the type genus of the Triglidae. with lepido, "scaled", a reference to the larger scales on these gurnards in comparison to those on Trigla.

Species
Lepidotrigla is the most speciose genus in the Triglidae and has 58 species classified within it:
 Lepidotrigla abyssalis D. S. Jordan & Starks, 1904
 Lepidotrigla alata (Houttuyn, 1782)
 Lepidotrigla alcocki Regan, 1908
 Lepidotrigla annamarae del Cerro & Lloris, 1997
 Lepidotrigla argus J. D. Ogilby, 1910 (Long-finned gurnard)
 Lepidotrigla argyrosoma Fowler, 1938
 Lepidotrigla bentuviai Richards & Saksena, 1977 (Twohorn gurnard)
 Lepidotrigla bispinosa Steindachner, 1898 (Bullhorn gurnard)
 Lepidotrigla brachyoptera F. W. Hutton, 1872 (Scaly gurnard)
 Lepidotrigla cadmani Regan, 1915 (Scalebreast gurnard)
 Lepidotrigla calodactyla J. D. Ogilby, 1910 (Drab longfin gurnard)
 Lepidotrigla carolae Richards, 1968 (Carol's gurnard)
 Lepidotrigla cavillone (Lacépède, 1801) (Large-scaled gurnard)
 Lepidotrigla deasoni Herre & Kauffman, 1952
 Lepidotrigla dieuzeidei Blanc & Hureau, 1973 (Spiny gurnard)
 Lepidotrigla eydouxii Sauvage, 1878
 Lepidotrigla faurei Gilchrist & W. W. Thompson, 1914 (Scalybreast gurnard)
 Lepidotrigla firmisquamis Prokofiev & Yato, 2020
 Lepidotrigla grandis J. D. Ogilby, 1910 (Supreme gurnard)
 Lepidotrigla guentheri Hilgendorf, 1879
 Lepidotrigla hime Matsubara & Hiyama, 1932
 Lepidotrigla japonica (Bleeker, 1854)
 Lepidotrigla jimjoebob Richards, 1992
 Lepidotrigla kanagashira Kamohara, 1936
 Lepidotrigla kishinouyi Snyder, 1911
 Lepidotrigla larsoni del Cerro & Lloris, 1997 (Swordtip gurnard)
 Lepidotrigla lepidojugulata S. Z. Li, 1981
 Lepidotrigla longifaciata Yato, 1981
 Lepidotrigla longimana S. Z. Li, 1981
 Lepidotrigla longipinnis Alcock, 1890
 Lepidotrigla macracaina Gomon & Kawai 2018
 Lepidotrigla macrobrachia Fowler, 1938
 Lepidotrigla maculapinna Gomon & Kawai 2018
 Lepidotrigla marisinensis (Fowler, 1938)
 Lepidotrigla microptera Günther, 1873
 Lepidotrigla modesta Waite, 1899 (Grooved gurnard)
 Lepidotrigla mulhalli W. J. Macleay, 1884 (Rough-snouted gurnard)
 Lepidotrigla multispinosa J. L. B. Smith, 1934 (Indian Ocean spiny gurnard)
 Lepidotrigla musorstom del Cerro & Lloris, 1997
 Lepidotrigla nana del Cerro & Lloris, 1997
 Lepidotrigla oglina Fowler, 1938
 Lepidotrigla omanensis Regan, 1905 (Oman gurnard)
 Lepidotrigla papilio (Cuvier, 1829) (Australian spiny gurnard)
 Lepidotrigla pectoralis Fowler, 1938
 Lepidotrigla pleuracanthica J. Richardson, 1845 (Eastern spiny gurnard)
 Lepidotrigla psolokerkos Gomon & Psomadakis, 2018
 Lepidotrigla punctipectoralis Fowler, 1938 (Finspot gurnard)
 Lepidotrigla robinsi Richards, 1997
 Lepidotrigla russelli del Cerro & Lloris, 1995 (Smooth gurnard)
 Lepidotrigla sayademalha Richards, 1992
 Lepidotrigla sereti del Cerro & Lloris, 1997
 Lepidotrigla spiloptera Günther, 1880 (Spotwing gurnard)
 Lepidotrigla spinosa Gomon, 1987 (Shortfin gurnard)
 Lepidotrigla tanydactyla Gomon & Kawai 2018
 Lepidotrigla umbrosa J. D. Ogilby, 1910 (Blackspot gurnard)
 Lepidotrigla vanessa (J. Richardson, 1839) (Butterfly gurnard)
 Lepidotrigla vaubani del Cerro & Lloris, 1997
 Lepidotrigla venusta Fowler, 1938

Characteristics
Lepidotrigla gurnards are characterised by having the 3 lower rays of the pectoral fin free of the fin membrane and a scaled tail, like the other Triglid gurnards. The bucklers, bony plate at the base of the dorsal fin spines and rays, have with sharp spines on their rears along the whole length of both first and seconddorsal fins. The groobe behin the eyes of these fishes may be complete, running from one side of the head to the other, or there may be just a furrow behind each eye. There are large, ctenoid scales on the body, although some species have cycloid scales on the belly. There are fewer tha than 70 scales in the lateral line. There may, or may not be vomerine teeth.

Distribution
Lepidotrigla gurnards are found in the tropical and warm temperate waters of the eastern Atlantic, Indian and Western Pacific Oceans, with one species L. jimjoebob being found as far east as the Line Islands in the eastern central Pacific.

See also
 List of prehistoric bony fish

References

External links

 
Triglinae
Marine fish genera
Taxa named by Albert Günther